Giampiero Albertini (20 December 1927 – 14 May 1991) was an Italian film, television and voice actor.

Biography
Born in Muggiò, Albertini started his career as stage actor at the Piccolo Teatro in Milan, under the guidance of Giorgio Strehler. In 1962, he made his film debut with Dino Risi's La marcia su Roma, and later worked with, among others, Mario Monicelli, Luigi Comencini, Carlo Lizzani, Francesco Rosi, Gillo Pontecorvo, Nanni Loy. Albertini also was active in poliziotteschi and giallo films, in which he was sometimes credited as Al Albert.

During the 1970s, Albertini was featured in the Ignis commercials as a disgruntled customer struggling to find the items he is searching for.

As a voice actor, Albertini was best known as the official Italian dubbing voice of Peter Falk as the title character in Columbo. He has also occasionally dubbed other actors such as Martin Balsam, Donald Pleasence, Phil Brown, Brian Keith, Terry Jones and Vic Tayback. One of his final dubbing works was the voice of Saddam Hussein in his interview with Bruno Vespa on Rai 1.

Death
Albertini died of a heart attack, at his home in Monte Mario in Rome, on 14 May 1991 at the age of 63. The dubbing voice of Columbo was passed on to Antonio Guidi in the remaining seasons of the show.

Filmography

Cinema

March on Rome (1962) - Cristoforo
The Organizer (1963) - Porro
La vita agra (1964) - Libero Fornaciari
Thrilling (1965) - Il "Rosso" (segment "L'autostrada del sole")
Seven Golden Men (1965) - August (le portugais)
Made in Italy (1965) - Immigrant (segment "6 Final episode")
Seven Golden Men Strike Again (1966) - August
The Million Dollar Countdown (1967) - Joe
Tiffany Memorandum (1967) - Callaghan's Agent / Doctor
The Head of the Family (1967)
Italian Secret Service (1968) - Ottone
Days of Fire (1968) - Sempresi
A Minute to Pray, a Second to Die (1968) - Fred Duskin
Summit (1968)
The Black Sheep (1968) - Senator Santarini
Commandos (1968) - Aldo
Eat It (1968) - Farmer
Burn! (1969) - Henry Thompson
Bolidi sull'asfalto - A tutta birra! (1970) - Albertarelli
Many Wars Ago (1970) - Capt. Abbati
Return of Sabata (1971) - Joe McIntock
The Life of Leonardo da Vinci (1971) - Ludovico il Moro
The Case of the Bloody Iris (1972) - Commissioner Enci
Partirono preti, tornarono... curati (1973) - Gen. Miguel
Seven Hours of Violence (1973) - Police Commissioner
La rosa rossa (1973) 
 The Suspects (1974) - Matteo Gallone
E cominciò il viaggio nella vertigine (1974) - Train's escort officer
Zorro (1975) - Brother Francisco
Mark of the Cop (1975) - Brigadiere Bonetti
The Tough Ones (1976) - Commissioner Caputo
L'Année sainte (1976) - Commissaire Mazzola
A Matter of Time (1976) - Mr. De Perma
Mark Strikes Again (1976) - Montelli
The Last Round (1976) - Sapienza
Le Gang (1977) - Léon
Tre soldi e la donna di classe (1977)
Return of the 38 Gang (1977) - Folco Bordoni
Dove volano i corvi d'argento (1977) - Istevene's father
Non sparate sui bambini (1978) - Sign. Settimi
Suggestionata (1978) - Francesco / Rachele's father
The Life of Verdi (1982)
The Betrothed (1989)
Saremo felici (1989)

Dubbing roles

Animation
Smoke in Cartoon All-Stars to the Rescue

Live action
Lieutenant Colombo in Columbo (seasons 1-8)
Sam Diamond in Murder by Death
Lou Peckinpaugh in The Cheap Detective
Peter Falk in Wings of Desire
Ray Calhoun in Hang 'Em High
Tang Wu in The Love Bug
Owen Lars in Star Wars: Episode IV – A New Hope
Sheriff Jellicol in The Big Gundown
Mel Sharples in Alice Doesn't Live Here Anymore
Theodore Roosevelt in The Wind and the Lion
Bennett Cross in Death Wish 3
Sanchez in Mackenna's Gold
Ernst Stavro Blofeld in You Only Live Twice
Sir Bedevere in Monty Python and the Holy Grail

References

External links 

 
 

1927 births
1991 deaths
Italian male stage actors
Italian male film actors
Italian male voice actors
Italian television personalities
People from the Province of Monza e Brianza
20th-century Italian male actors